André, Baron Vlerick (1919–1990) was a Belgian politician, businessman, professor and founder of the Vlerick Leuven Gent Management School. He graduated in economy at the University of Ghent and was appointed at the University of Leuven as well as the University of Ghent as Professor of Economics. He founded the department of regional economy at the University of Ghent.
He is also the founder of Protea, a pro-apartheid Belgian organisation which assisted the South African apartheid government in money laundering and circumventing sanctions through KredietBank. Vlerick's lobbying efforts extended to a pan-European formation called Eurosa. In addition to Protea in Belgium, there were “sister organisations” in Austria, Britain, Denmark, France, Italy, the Netherlands, Switzerland and West Germany. Evidence collected from Vlerick's archive has established that Eurosa received direct funding from the apartheid government.  
A member of the Christian People's Party he was appointed during various Belgian Governments in the 1960s-1970s as Minister of the Flemish Regional Economy, actually till his appointment as Minister of Finance in 1972. He was also appointed after the war as the Administrator of the Marshall Plan for Belgium. He was instrumental in the after-War years of the successful Flemish economic development. André Vlerick was a son-in-law of Gustave Sap and the uncle of Philippe Vlerick.

Publications
 U.S. Foreign business operations seen by a European Stanford Business Conference, Stanford University (U.S.A.) 1960.

Sources
 Aloïs Van De Voorde, André Vlerick : een minister-manager - een politieke biografie'', Lannoo, Tielt, 1996.

External links 
 André Vlerick in ODIS - Online Database for Intermediary Structures 
 Archives of André Vlerick in ODIS - Online Database for Intermediary Structures

References

1919 births
1990 deaths
Barons of Belgium
Belgian economists
Christian Democratic and Flemish politicians
Finance ministers of Belgium
Flemish businesspeople
Flemish nobility
Flemish politicians
Ghent University alumni
Academic staff of Ghent University
Academic staff of KU Leuven
People from Kortrijk